Soft Cell's Non-Stop Exotic Video Show is a video album by British synthpop duo Soft Cell. It is a companion release to their debut album, Non-Stop Erotic Cabaret. The collection was originally issued on VHS, Betamax and Laserdisc in 1982, and re-issued on DVD in 2004.

Track listing
 "Entertain Me"
 "Bedsitter"
 "Frustration"
 "Torch"
 "Seedy Films"
 "Secret Life"
 "Tainted Love"
 "Youth"
 "Memorabilia"
 "Sex Dwarf"
 "What"
 "Say Hello, Wave Goodbye"

References

External links 
 

Soft Cell video albums
Music video compilation albums
1982 video albums
1982 compilation albums